Vernetta Lopez (born 22 July 1973) is a Singaporean actress and radio DJ. She played the role of Denise in sitcom Under One Roof from 1995 to 2003.

Career
Other than being a radio DJ, actress, voice-over artiste, and emcee, Lopez is also a wedding planner and former president of "One Singapore".

Acting
Lopez's actual first television appearance was for a music television program called NiteRage, where from five hosts, it was streamlined to just two; Vernetta Lopez and Bernard Lim. Starring in Singapore's first family sitcom shot Lopez to stardom in the 1990s. Playing Denise, the comedy hit record breaking ratings and started Vernetta on her acting career professionally. Since then, she has starred in various productions and has taken on roles ranging from daughters to mothers, and from doctors to mental patients.

She also played the role of a Gynaecologist, Dr Kelly Chan, alongside Amy Cheng and Edmund Chen, in a Singapore medical drama First Touch, where it explored her personal life and her work life, which contradicted each other. In later years, she was cast in the legal drama series The Pupil and Code of Law as Deputy Public Prosecutor Vivian Lau.

She has starred in other television sitcoms like, Can I Help You, Mind Your Language, Shiver, Random Acts, Big Day Out, and Okto Channel's Zero Hero, playing Lady Magnificent alongside Timothy Nga.

She has also starred in Hansel and Gretel by Wild Rice Productions.

Lopez has also starred in Rain Tree Production's local English film, The Leap Years, alongside Wong Li-Lin, Nadya Hutagalung, and Paula Malai Ali. She also made cameo appearances in local feature film City Sharks in 2003 and as a woman at the turnstile in the 2015 Hollywood sci-fi film Equals.

Radio DJ
Lopez has worked as a radio DJ since 1994. She worked first as a DJ on Heart 91.3, before moving on to Perfect 987FM, Class 95FM, and to the Breakfast Show with Mark Van Cuylenberg on Gold 90.5. Having won several Favorite Radio DJ over several years, Lopez hosts the weekday morning show from 6am to 10am with Mike Kasem on Live with Mike & Vernetta on Gold 90.5.

Personal life
Lopez was educated at Assumption English School and earned her diploma for Mass Communication at Ngee Ann Polytechnic and later finished her bachelor's degree in Mass Communication with the Singapore Institute of Management.

In 1998, Lopez married fellow radio DJ Mark Richmond. The couple divorced in 2005.

Lopez then married British software engineer Wayne Gladwin on 25 July 2009.

Filmography

Film

Television

Awards and nominations 
Lopez won her first Asian Television Awards in 2000 for her role in Under One Roof as Denise with the award for Best Performance by an Actress (Comedy) and her second ATV award in 2003 for drama with the award for Best Performance by an Actress (Drama) for her role in Ceciliation.

At the 2016 Asian Television Awards, Lopez was nominated twice in the same category (Best Comedy Performance by an Actor/Actress) for her roles in Run Rachael Run and Rojak. Although she did not win the ATV in 2016 she did receive the accolade of 'Highly Commended' for her role in Run Rachael Run.

References

External links

 Vernetta Lopez profile on The Celebrity Agency
 

Vernetta Lopez official website

Women DJs
Living people
Ngee Ann Polytechnic alumni
Singaporean DJs
Singaporean people of Chinese descent
Singaporean people of Kristang descent
Singaporean people of Portuguese descent
Singaporean people of Thai descent
Singaporean television actresses
Singaporean film actresses
21st-century women musicians
1973 births